Redemption of the Beast is the sixth compilation album by American rapper DMX. It was released by Seven Arts Music on January 13, 2015. It is composed of unreleased DMX songs, however the album was not authorized by DMX to be released.

Background

The album features a track from former Roc-A-Fella artist Freeway, and former Flipmode artist Rampage. Swizz Beatz reportedly posted via Instagram that this album is a fraud and not the album he was working on with DMX, stating: "I see a lot of people hitting me about this album!!! I can tell you 100% this is not the album X and I are working on!!!! (I feel like Timbo with the Aaliyah movie rite now) SMH !!!!!! #DontdisrespecttheDog We Got Fire coming." HipHopDX stated in an article that this album was released through Seven Arts Music and that DMX reportedly did not consent to the release of the album, claiming the music to be "stolen"; however, Seven Arts Music claimed to have purchased the masters of the tracks and this was supposedly the second agreed upon album (Undisputed being the first) to be released on this imprint.

Production and unauthorized release
In 2013, DMX announced he had begun working on his eighth studio album. He had been seen collaborating with producers Swizz Beatz and Dame Grease. In December, after regaining his passport, he embarked on a world tour with performances in Bulgaria and Serbia.

On January 7, 2015, it was announced by DMX's label Seven Arts Music, that he would be releasing a new album the next week entitled Redemption of the Beast, though Swizz Beatz and DMX's management stated later in the day that this was incorrect. On January 13, 2015, Seven Arts Music released the album. Two days later, it was announced by DMX's brother and manager Montana that DMX was no longer signed to Seven Arts Music and that they would be taking legal action against the label for the album's unauthorized release, stating,

Track listing

Notes 
"We Gonna Make It" samples the  vocals from "It's a Problem"
"Love That B*tch" was first released on DMX's seventh studio album Undisputed as a bonus track in 2012.

References

DMX (rapper) albums
2015 mixtape albums
Albums produced by Swizz Beatz
Albums produced by Dame Grease
Unauthorized albums
Copyright infringement